The 2005 Superstars Series was the first season of the Campionato Italiano Superstars (Italian Superstars Championship).
The championship was won by Francesco Ascani driving for BMW.

Teams and drivers

External links
Official Superstars website

Superstars Series
Superstars Series seasons